Park Jong-oh (born 12 April 1991) is a South Korean professional footballer who plays as a defender.

Club career

Real Kashmir
In December 2021, Park signed for I-League club Real Kashmir.

On 4 March, he made his debut for the club against Kenkre in the I-League, in a thrilling 1–1 stalemate. He scored his first goal for the club against Indian Arrows on 2 April, which ended in a 1–1 stalemate. Rohmingthanga Bawlte played in a cross into the back post from the right flank, and Park arrived into the box to finish with a first time volley back across goal.

Career statistics

Club

References

1991 births
Living people
Hanyang University alumni
South Korean footballers
South Korean expatriate footballers
Association football defenders
K League 2 players
Korea National League players
Park Jong-oh
K4 League players
Park Jong-oh
Bucheon FC 1995 players
Park Jong-oh
Park Jong-oh
South Korean expatriate sportspeople in Thailand
Expatriate footballers in Thailand